is a railway station in the city of Tokoname, Aichi, Japan, operated by Meitetsu.

Lines

Station layout
The station has two opposed elevated side platforms with the station building underneath. The station has automated ticket machines, Manaca automated turnstiles and it is unattended.

Platforms

Adjacent stations

Station history
The Meitetsu Airport Line began operations between Tokoname Station and Central Japan International Airport Station on October 16, 2004. Rinkū Tokoname Station, an intermediate stop, was opened on January 29, 2005.

Passenger statistics
In fiscal 2016, the station was used by an average of 1,291 passengers daily (boarding passengers only).

Surrounding area
Aeon Mall Tokoname

See also
 List of Railway Stations in Japan

References

External links

 Official web page 

Railway stations in Japan opened in 2005
Railway stations in Aichi Prefecture
Stations of Nagoya Railroad
Tokoname